Royal Air Force North Killingholme or more simply RAF North Killingholme is a former Royal Air Force station located immediately west of the village of North Killingholme in North Lincolnshire, England.

The airfield was extensively used during the Second World War by Avro Lancaster bombers.

History

The RAF station opened in November 1943 and became fully operational in January 1944 when 550 Squadron moved there from RAF Waltham.

The station was with No. 1 Group RAF.  No. 14 Base HQ was based at the airfield between 1944 and 1945.

It remained operational until October 1945. 550 squadron was the only squadron to be based at North Killingholme and flew only Avro Lancasters.

After North Killingholme closed, the land reverted to agriculture use, but the layout of the station is very easy to see from aerial photographs.

There is the North Killingholme Industrial Estate on the site along with a large depot for Volvo construction equipment.

See also
 List of former Royal Air Force stations
 RAF Kirmington, a nearby airfield, later became Humberside Airport.

References

Citations

Bibliography

External links

 RAF 550 Squadron and North Killingholme Association
 RAF Lincolnshire
 Former RAF North Killingholme at wikimapia.org
 RAF North Killingholme North Lincolnshire Airfield

Royal Air Force stations in Lincolnshire
History of Lincolnshire
Royal Air Force stations of World War II in the United Kingdom
Military units and formations established in 1943
Military units and formations disestablished in 1945